The FIIC Intercrosse World Championship is the bi-annual international championship for intercrosse. The World Championship is organised by the Fédération Internationale d’Inter-Crosse (FIIC). The men's competition was started in 1999 and the women's in 2001. The men's and women's tournaments are usually held in the same venue.

Men's results

Performance by team

Medals table

Until 2002 and again since 2016, Canada has played under the name  Quebec.

Women's results

Medals table

Until 2002 and again since 2016, Canada has played under the name  Quebec.

References

External links
 FIIC World Championship official site
 History

Recurring sporting events established in 1999
Intercrosse